Funny or Die Presents is a half-hour sketch comedy show that spawned from the comedy video website created by Will Ferrell and Adam McKay, Funny or Die. It premiered on HBO on February 19, 2010.

Series overview

Episodes

Season 1 (2010)

Season 2 (2011)

References

Funny or Die Presents